Padang Besar is a federal constituency in Perlis, Malaysia, that has been represented in the Dewan Rakyat since 1995.

The federal constituency was created from parts of the Kangar constituency in the 1994 redistribution and is mandated to return a single member to the Dewan Rakyat under the first past the post voting system.

Demographics

History

Polling districts 
According to the federal gazette issued on 31 October 2022, the Padang Besar constituency is divided into 27 polling districts.

Representation history

State constituency

Current state assembly members

Local governments

Election results

References

Perlis federal constituencies